Jantar Mantar  is located in the modern city of New Delhi. “Jantar Mantar” it means “instruments for measuring the harmony of the heavens”. It consists of 13 architectural astronomy instruments. The site is one of five built by Maharaja Jai Singh II of Jaipur, from 1723 onwards, revising the calendar and astronomical tables. Jai Singh, born in 1688 into a royal Rajput family that ruled the regional kingdom, was born into an era of education that maintained a keen interest in astronomy. There is a plaque fixed on one of the structures in the Jantar Mantar observatory in New Delhi that was placed there in 1910 mistakenly dating the construction of the complex to the year 1710. Later research, though, suggests 1724 as the actual year of construction.

The primary purpose of the observatory was to compile astronomical tables, and to predict the times and movements of the sun, moon and planets. Some of these purposes nowadays would be classified as astronomy.

Completed in 1724, the Delhi Jantar Mantar had decayed considerably by 1857 uprising. The Ram Yantra, the Samrat Yantra, the Jai Prakash Yantra and the Misra Yantra are the distinct instruments of Jantar Mantar. The most famous of these structure, the Jaipur, had also deteriorated by the end of the nineteenth century until in 1901 Maharaja Ram Singh set out to restore the instrument.

History 
Jantar Mantar located in New Delhi is built by Maharaja Jai Singh II of Jaipur in the year 1724. The maharaja built five observatories during his ruling time in the 18th century. Among these five the one in Delhi is the first to be built. The other four observatories are located in Ujjain, Mathura, Varanasi, and Jaipur.

The objective behind the construction of these observatories was to assemble astronomical data and to accurately predict the movement of the planets, moon, sun, etc. in the solar system. It was one of its kind at the time it was built. By the year 1867, when India was under the British Raj, the observatory had underwent considerable decay.

Purpose of individual structures

The 4 distinct instruments within the observatory of Jantar Mantar in New Delhi: the Samrat Yantra, the Jayaprakash, Rama Yantra and the Misra Yantra.

 Samrat Yantra: The Samrat Yantra, or Supreme Instrument, is a giant triangle that is basically an equal hour sundial.  It is 70 feet high, 114 feet long at the base, and 10 feet thick.  It has a  hypotenuse that is parallel to the Earth's axis and points toward the North Pole.  On either side of the triangle is a quadrant with graduations indicating hours, minutes, and seconds.  At the time of the Samrat Yantra's construction, sundials already existed, but the Samrat Yantra turned the basic hug sundial into a precision tool for measuring declination and other related coordinates of various heavenly bodies. The Vrihat Samrat Yantra can calculate the local time at an accuracy of up to two seconds and is considered the world's largest sundial.
 Jaya Prakash Yantra: The Jaya Prakash consists of hollowed out hemispheres with markings on their concave surfaces. Crosswires were stretched between points on their rim.  From inside the Ram, an observer could align the position of a star with various markings or a window's edge. This is one of the most versatile and complex instruments that can give the coordinates of celestial objects in multiple systems- the Azimuthal-altitude system and the Equatorial coordinate system. This allowed for the easy conversation of the popular celestial system. 

 Rama Yantra: Two large cylindrical structures with open top, used to measure the altitude of stars based on the latitude and the longitude on the earth.
 Misra Yantra: The Misra Yantra (Literally mixed instrument) is a composition of 5 instruments designed as a tool to determine the shortest and longest days of the year. It could also be used to indicate the exact moment of noon in various cities and locations regardless of their distance from Delhi. The Misra yantra was able to indicate when it was noon in various cities all over the world and was the only structure in the observatory not invented by Jai Singh II.
Shasthansa Yantra: Using a pinhole camera mechanism, it has been built within the towers that support the quadrant scales. It is used to measure specific measurements of the sun such as the zenith distance, declination, and diameter of the sun.
Kapala Yantra: Built on the same principle as the jai Prakash, the instrument is used more as a demonstration to indicate the transformation of one coordinate system to another. Not used for active celestial observation.
Rasivalya Yantra: Twelve of these structure where built, each referring to the zodiacal constellations by measuring the latitude and longitude of a celestial object at the very moment the celestial object crosses the meridian.

Other observatories
Between 1727 and 1734 Jai Singh II built five similar observatories in west-central India, all known by the name Jantar Mantar. They are located at
 Jaipur, 
 Ujjain, 
 Mathura, and 
 Varanasi. 
While the purpose of the Jantar Mantar was astronomy and astrology (Jyotish), they are also a major tourist attraction and a significant monument of the history of astronomy.

Gallery

See also
 List of astronomical observatories
 Mantras
 Rajput architecture
 Tantra
 Yantra

References

Introduction www.jantarmantar.org.
Awake (2005). Jantar Mantar An Observatory Without Telescopes. Awake,86 (13),18-20.
Jantar Mantar British Library

Further reading
 Comprehensive report on history and instrument design at Jantar Mantar
 Sharma, Virendra Nath (1995). Sawai Jai Singh and his astronomy. Motilal Banarsidass Publishers Pvt. Ltd. .
 Articles on Jantar Mantar

External links
 Jantar Mantar - The Astronomical Observatories of Jai Singh II
 Observations on Jantar Mantar in New Delhi
 Step Inside Jantar Mantar in New Delhi 
 Architectural Astronomy Instruments (video in English)
 Jantar Mantar—An Observatory Without Telescopes (in English)
 जंतर मंतर—बगैर टेलिस्कोप की वेधशाला (in Hindi)

1724 establishments in India
Archaeoastronomy
Archaeological monuments in Delhi
Astronomical observatories in India
Buildings and structures completed in 1724
Monuments of National Importance in Delhi
New Delhi
Rajput architecture
Tourist attractions in Delhi